Jelmer Beulenkamp (born 16 November 1977) is a former speed skater. He was the Dutch speed skating champion in 1998. In 2003, he switched to marathon skating.

In his speed skating career Beulenkamp skated one world record.

World record 

Source: SpeedSkatingStats.com

References 

 Jelmer Beulenkamp at SpeedSkatingStats.com

1977 births
Living people
Dutch male speed skaters
World record setters in speed skating
Sportspeople from Utrecht (city)